Ha'afuasia is a village in Wallis and Futuna. It is located in Hahake District on the east coast of Wallis Island. Its population according to the 2018 census was 299 people.
To the northwest is Lake Kikila.

References

Populated places in Wallis and Futuna